Samantha Bayley (born ) is a British female artistic gymnast. She represents her nation at international competitions. As a junior, she competed at the 2004 European Women's Artistic Gymnastics Championships. As an elite she competed at the 2005 European Artistic Gymnastics Championships where she reached the final in the vault event.

References

1988 births
Living people
British female artistic gymnasts
Place of birth missing (living people)